Boronia lanuginosa
is a plant in the citrus family Rutaceae and is endemic to northern Australia. 
It is a shrub with woolly pinnate leaves.

Description
The leaves are pinnate, the pinnae being linear with revolute margins.
Its flowers are white to pink and it flowers and fruits from January through to November (January to September.)

Taxonomy and naming
This species was first formally described in 1837 by the Austrian botanist, Endlicher, who gave it the name Boronia lanuginosa. 
The specific epithet comes from the Latin, lanuginosa,  meaning woolly or downy.

Distribution and habitat
Boronia lanuginosa is found in Western Australia, the Northern Territory and Queensland. However, the occurrence records show this as an essentially Top End species. It is found in the IBRA regions of Victoria Bonaparte, Arnhem Coast, Arnhem Plateau, Central Arnhem, Daly Basin, Darwin Coastal, Gulf Coastal, Gulf Fall and Uplands, Gulf Plains, and Pine Creek.
It grows on sandstone and sand, in gullies and creekbeds, and in woodland and forest.

References 

lanuginosa
Flora of the Northern Territory
Flora of Western Australia
Flora of Queensland
Apiales of Australia
Plants described in 1837
Taxa named by Stephan Endlicher